A legislative assembly election was held in the Indian union territory of Puducherry 13 April 2011 to elect members from thirty constituencies in the non-contiguous territory. This election was meant to constitute the Thirteenth Assembly of Pondicherry.

Candidates
26 March 2011 marked the last day to complete nominations for the elections. 30 March 2011 was the last day for possible withdrawal of nominations. In total, 187 candidates contested the polls. In Yanam there was a total of ten candidates, the highest number in any constituency in this election. In the Indira Nagar constituency there were just two candidates, former chief minister N. Rangaswamy (who also contested the Kadirkamam constituency, this was the first time in the history of the territory that a candidate contested two different assembly constituencies) and Indian National Congress candidate A.K.D. Aroumougame. The counting of the votes was scheduled for 13 May 2011.

Campaign
Amongst the contending parties, there were two major coalitions. On one side, there was an alliance backing the incumbent chief minister V. Vaithilingam, consisting of the Indian National Congress (which contested 17 seats), the Dravida Munnetra Kazhagam (10 seats), Pattali Makkal Katchi (2 seats) and the Viduthalai Chiruthaigal Katchi (1 seat). The other main bloc contesting the election was an alliance consisting of the All India N.R Congress of N. Rangaswamy (contesting 17 seats), the All India Anna Dravida Munnetra Kazhagam (10 seats), the Communist Party of India (Marxist) (1 seat), the Communist Party of India (1 seat) and the Desiya Murpokku Dravida Kazhagam (1 seat). A third force was the Bharatiya Janata Party, which did not align with any of the two big bloc and contested twenty seats on its own. There were also 78 independent candidates in the fray.

Several high-profile national politicians took part in the campaigning: Sonia Gandhi (president of the Indian National Congress), Rahul Gandhi (Indian National Congress general secretary), Pranab Mukherjee (Indian National Congress union minister), Nitin Gadkari (BJP president), Sushma Swaraj (BJP MP), Venkaiah Naidu (former BJP president), M. Karunanidhi (DMK chief minister of Tamil Nadu), J. Jayalalithaa (general secretary of AIADMK) and Vijayakanth (general secretary of DMDK).

Election
Over 810,000 voters were eligible to take part in the polls.

Parties and alliances
Source:





Results

Aftermath results 
N. Rangasamy of AINRC, who won 15 seats, formed government without consulting the AIADMK and was accused of betraying the coalition by J. Jayalalithaa. AINRC secured a majority with the support of an independent. However, the AINRC's hastiness in forming the government and refusal to share power with pre-election alliance partner AIADMK proved costly in the subsequent elections in 2016.

Results by constituency

References

Puducherry
2010
2010s in Puducherry